Earth Story is a 1998 BBC documentary series on geology presented by Aubrey Manning. A number of filming locations were used around the world including Alaska, India, and Barbados.

Episodes 
A total of eight episodes were produced with each episode having a runtime of 50 minutes.

 The Time Travellers (1 November 1998)
 The Deep (8 November 1998)
 Ring of Fire (15 November 1998)
 Journey to the Centre of the Earth (22 November 1998)
 The Roof of the World (6 December 1998)
 The Big Freeze (13 December 1998)
 The Living Earth (20 December 1998)
 A World Apart (27 December 1998)

Merchandise 
A two-disc DVD of the series was released on 7 August 2006.

A book entitled Earth Story: The Shaping of Our World was written by Simon Lamb and David Sington. It contains 240 pages and was released on 29 October 1998.

See also 
 Earth: The Power of the Planet 
 How the Earth Was Made

External links 
 
 

1998 British television series debuts
1998 British television series endings
1990s British documentary television series
BBC television documentaries about science
BBC television documentaries about history
British television documentaries
1990s British television miniseries
Documentaries about geology
English-language television shows